The 1983–84 Liga Alef season saw Hapoel Tiberias (champions of the North Division) and Maccabi Sha'arayim (champions of the South Division) win the title and promotion to Liga Artzit. Hapoel Ramat HaSharon also promoted after promotion play-offs.

North Division

South Division

Promotion play-offs

Hapoel Ramat HaSharon promoted to Liga Artzit.

References
Victory over Acre sent Beitar Netanya to the play-offs Maariv, 22.4.84, Historical Jewish Press 
Hapoel Ramat HaSharon returns to Promotion play-offs Maariv, 22.4.84, Historical Jewish Press 
Media journey to the past Hapoel "Nir" Ramat HaSharon 

Liga Alef seasons
Israel
3